This is a list of episodes for George of the Jungle.

Series overview

Episodes

Original run (2007–08)
The original run of the reboot ran only for twenty-six half-hour episodes (fifty-two 11-minute segments), all in a single season.

Revival run (2016–17)

The revival series aired on September 10, 2016. It aired on Nickelodeon in Poland and the Netherlands and Boomerang in the UK. It also airs on Cartoon Network in Australia and New Zealand.

References

See also
 George of the Jungle (2007 TV series)

External links
 TV Guide's George of the Jungle Episode list
 TV.com's George of the Jungle Episode Guide
 George of the Jungle (2007) on iTunes

George of the Jungle
George of the Jungle (2007 series)
George of the Jungle (2007 series)